Raimbaut is a given name. Notable people with the name include:

Raimbaut, Count of Orange (died 1121), elder son of Bertrand Raimbaut and of his first wife Gilberte
Raimbaut of Orange (1147–1173), or in Occitan Raimbaut d'Aurenga, was the lord of Orange and Aumelas and a troubadour
Raimbaut de Vaqueiras (1180–1207), Provençal troubadour and, later in his life, knight

See also
Raimbaud
Rimbaud (surname)
Reinebold
Reinbold
Regenbald
Regimbald